The banjo clock, or banjo timepiece, is an American wall clock with a banjo-shaped case. It was invented by Simon Willard, originally of Grafton, Massachusetts, later of Roxbury, Massachusetts, and patented in 1802. The banjo clock normally lacks a striking mechanism and indicates time only by its hands and dial, for which reason some horologists may insist upon calling it a timepiece rather than a true clock. In popular usage though, no such distinction is made.

The banjo style of wooden case usually features a round opening for a painted dial, a long-waisted throat, and a rectangular pendulum box with hinged door. Both the throat and door are ornamented with reverse-painted (verre églomisé) glass panels, and the case is usually flanked by curved and pierced brass frets. A finial mounted atop the case usually takes the form of a cast-brass eagle or a turned, giltwood acorn.

Only 4,000 authentic Simon Willard banjo clocks were made. The style was widely copied by other members of the Willard family of clockmakers and many others clockmakers, both craftsmen and industrial manufacturers. Variants of the banjo-style clock made by others include examples with square or diamond-shaped dials, and the extremely opulent, heavily gilt "girandole" style.

See also 
 Lighthouse clock

References

External links

  Willard House & Clock Museum, located in Grafton, Mass., the original homestead of Simon Willard, home to the largest collection of Simon Willard clocks and his patented timepieces.

American inventions
Clock designs
Antiques